Constantine Buckley Kilgore (February 20, 1835 – September 23, 1897) was a U.S. Representative from Texas.

Born in Newnan, Georgia, Kilgore moved with his parents to Rusk County, Texas, in 1846.
He received a common-school and academic training.
He studied law.
During the Civil War, Kilgore entered the Confederate States Army as a private and by 1862 had attained the rank of adjutant general of Ector's brigade, Army of the Tennessee.
He was admitted to the bar and practiced in Rusk County, Texas.

Kilgore was elected Justice of the Peace in 1869.
He served as a member of the State constitutional convention in 1875.

Kilgore was elected to the State senate in 1884 for a term of four years.
He was chosen president of that body in 1885 for two years.
He resigned from the State senate in 1886, having been elected to Congress.

Kilgore was elected as a Democrat to the Fiftieth and to the three succeeding Congresses (March 4, 1887 – March 3, 1895). When House Speaker Thomas Brackett Reed attempted to  end the "silent filibuster" in 1890, a process by which the minority party could stop House business by calling quorums but then not answering when their names were called, Reed ended the process by directing the House Clerk to record those not answering to their names when the roll was called as present but not voting. Kilgore famously attempted to avoid being counted by kicking through a locked door to escape the House chamber.

In 1895, President Grover Cleveland appointed Kilgore United States judge for the southern district of Indian Territory. He served from March 20, 1895 until his death in Ardmore, Indian Territory (now Oklahoma) on September 23, 1897. Kilgore was interred at White Rose Cemetery, Wills Point, Texas.

References

Sources

External links

1835 births
1897 deaths
American justices of the peace
Confederate States Army officers
Democratic Party members of the United States House of Representatives from Texas
19th-century American politicians
People from Newnan, Georgia
People from Rusk County, Texas
People from Ardmore, Oklahoma
19th-century American judges
Military personnel from Texas